Childress Independent School District is a public school district based in Childress, Texas (USA).  Located in Childress County, small portions of the district extend into Cottle, Hall, and Hardeman counties.  The current learning system for Childress is CSCOPE. Childress also participates in UIL activities.

In 2009, the school district was rated "recognized" by the Texas Education Agency.

On July 1, 1985, the Estelline Independent School District merged into Childress ISD.

Schools
Childress High School (Grades 9-12)
Childress Junior High School (Grades 6-8)
Childress Elementary School (Grades PK-5)

References

External links
Childress ISD

School districts in Childress County, Texas
School districts in Cottle County, Texas
School districts in Hall County, Texas
School districts in Hardeman County, Texas